Amanita flavescens is a species of Amanita found in Sweden and Norway.

References

External links

flavescens
Fungi of Europe